A Kiss for a Killer (French: Une manche et la belle) is a 1957 French thriller film directed by Henri Verneuil and starring Henri Vidal, Mylène Demongeot and Isa Miranda. It is based on the 1954 novel The Sucker Punch by James Hadley Chase.

It was shot at the Victorine Studios in Nice. The film's sets were designed by the art director Jean d'Eaubonne.

Synopsis
A wealthy widow living in Nice marries an attractive but self-centred young man. Soon after the wedding he meets and falls in love with her niece Eva, whose calculating ambitions lead her to push him to murder her aunt.

Cast
 Henri Vidal as Philippe Delaroche
 Mylène Demongeot as Eva Dollan
 Isa Miranda as Betty Farnwell
 Jean-Loup Philippe as Bob Farnwell
 Simone Bach as Sylvette Guibert
 Antonin Berval as Le maire
 Jean Galland as Bank manager
 Ky Duyen as Chang
 André Roanne as Le commissaire
 Marc Valbel as Monsieur Edmond
 Alfred Adam as L'inspecteur de police Malard

References

Bibliography 
 Goble, Alan. The Complete Index to Literary Sources in Film. Walter de Gruyter, 1999.
 Hayward, Susan. French Costume Drama of the 1950s: Fashioning Politics in Film. Intellect Books, 2010.

External links 
 

1957 films
1950s thriller films
French thriller films
1950s French-language films
Films directed by Henri Verneuil
Films set in Nice
Films shot in Nice
Films shot at Victorine Studios
Films based on British novels
1950s French films